Jordon Dizon (born January 16, 1986) is a retired American football linebacker who currently serves as a National Scout for the Philadelphia Eagles of the National Football League. He last played for the Detroit Lions of the National Football League (NFL).  Dizon played college football for the University of Colorado, and was recognized as a consensus All-American.  The Detroit Lions selected him in the second round of the 2008 NFL Draft, and he played for the Lions for two seasons.  He suffered a severe knee injury in 2010, which ended his career.

Early years
Dizon was born and raised on the Hawaiian island of Kaua'i.  The son of Clifford Dizon and Darla Abbatiello-Higa, he attended Waimea High School, graduating in 2004. Playing running back and linebacker for the school of 860, Dizon rushed for 1,157 yards and 13 touchdowns in only five games as a junior, registering 75 stops on defense. During that year, Dizon rushed 37 times for 376 yards and five touchdowns in a 55-0 win over Kapaa—all career highs. Injured through most of his senior season (two games played: one carry, 12 yards, one touchdown; nine catches, 250 yards, three touchdowns), the Buffaloes were the only program to extend Dizon a scholarship offer, although he was recruited by other Big 12 and Pac-10 schools. He committed to play in Boulder on July 8, 2003, despite never having visited the state of Colorado. Dizon also lettered in basketball, track, and soccer during his time in high school.

College career
Dizon attended the University of Colorado, where he played for the Colorado Buffaloes football team from 2004 to 2007.  He first played safety as a true freshman at Colorado, but was moved to linebacker before the season began. On September 4, 2004, playing against Colorado State University, Dizon became the first true freshman in school history to start a season opener at inside linebacker. Playing in all 12 games as an 18-year-old, Dizon easily set the school freshman record for tackles in a season with 82. Over the next two years, Dizon continued to rack up the tackles, posting 61 in 2005 and 137 in 2006. The latter number was most tackles made by a CU player in nearly a decade (Ryan Sutter had 170 in 1997).

During 2007, Dizon posted a single-game career-high in tackles against CSU (22) and  set the single-season school record for third-down stops, with 19 in 12 games. Rarely leaving the field for the Buffs, Dizon missed only 34 of Colorado's 830 defensive snaps during the 2007 season. His 160 tackles were nearly double the next closest player on the team (safety Dan Dykes registered 83), and he finished his senior season with the most total tackles of any player on any Division I team in the nation. Colorado linebackers coach Brian Cabral, who recruited Dizon out of high school, called the senior "the most complete, every down player that I've ever coached."

As a senior, Dizon recorded the best statistical season for a Buff linebacker since Matt Russell's 1996 Butkus-winning campaign.  He was voted runner-up for the 2007 Butkus Award, given each year to college football's best linebacker.  Dizon was recognized as a consensus first-team All American, after receiving first-team honors from the Walter Camp Football Foundation, the Associated Press, Sporting News, ESPN, and Rivals.com for the 2007 NCAA Division I-A football season, and was named the Big 12 Conference's Defensive Player of the Year as a senior. A four-year starter for the Buffs, Dizon finished his collegiate career as the second-leading tackler among all active players.

College statistics

Awards and recognition
2004
Big 12 Defensive Newcomer of the Year
Defensive Freshman of the Year (Big 12 Coaches)
Second-team Freshman All-American (The Sporting News, Rivals.com)
Honorable mention All-Big 12 (Associated Press)
Freshman All-Big 12 team (The Sporting News)
2005
Honorable mention All-Big 12 (Big 12 Coaches)
2006
Second-team All-Big 12 (Associated Press)
Honorable mention All-Big 12 (Big 12 Coaches)
First-team All-Big 12 (San Antonio Express-News)
Butkus Award watch list
2007
Consensus First-team All-American
Walter Camp Football Foundation
The Sporting News
Associated Press
ESPN
Rivals.com
Big 12 Defensive Player of the Year
First-team All-Big 12 (Big 12 Coaches, San Antonio Express-News)
Butkus Award Runner-up
Lott Trophy semifinalist
Second-team Academic All-Big 12
Mid-season All-American
Sports Illustrated
Rivals.com
Phil Steele's College Football
Mid-season All-Big 12

Professional career

2008 NFL Draft
During CU's pro timing day, Dizon ran the forty yard dash in 4.59 seconds—which would have registered among the five fastest times recorded by a linebacker at the 2008 NFL Combine. His 34.5 inch vertical jump also impressed scouts, while Dizon's meager 12 repetitions lifting 225 pounds was considered poor for a linebacker. On April 26, 2008, Dizon was chosen 45th overall in the 2nd round of the 2008 draft by the Detroit Lions.

Detroit Lions
Dizon's first season saw the rookie struggle to find consistent playing time. He finished the season with 31 total tackles, 14 of which came on special teams. When hired in January 2009, coach Jim Schwartz changed defensive schemes, moving Dizon back to the outside linebacker position. During the 2009 off-season, Dizon earned high praise from Lions defensive coordinator Gunther Cunningham and linebackers coach Matt Burke, the latter of whom noted, "Jordon’s probably been one of the hardest workers I have. He works really hard at it. He wants to do better, he wants to do it right and he really works at it. I’ve been really pleased with the work he’s done."
Dizon tore two tendons in his knee and damaged a third during the 2010 NFL preseason. He was placed on injured reserve on August 16, 2010. He was released by the Lions on July 28, 2011.

Post-playing career
Dizon served as the assistant pro scouting director for the Denver Broncos from 2015 to 2022.

On May 14, 2022, Dizon was hired by the Philadelphia Eagles to serve as a national scout.

Personal life

Dizon graduated from the University of Colorado in May 2008 with a degree in economics. He attended Waimea High School in Kauai, Hawaii, the westernmost high school in the United States. Growing up in Kauai, Dizon often hunted wild boar with only a knife. He is an avid golfer, shooting sub-80 before his senior season began.

See also
Colorado Buffaloes football
2005 Colorado Buffaloes football team
2006 Colorado Buffaloes football team
2007 Colorado Buffaloes football team
2007 College Football All-America Team

References

External links

University of Colorado Bio 

1986 births
Living people
Players of American football from Hawaii
People from Kauai County, Hawaii
All-American college football players
American football linebackers
Colorado Buffaloes football players
Detroit Lions players